The canton of Poncin is a former administrative division in eastern France. It was disbanded following the French canton reorganisation which came into effect in March 2015. It consisted of 9 communes, which joined the canton of Pont-d'Ain in 2015. It had 7,227 inhabitants (2012).

The canton comprised 9 communes:

Boyeux-Saint-Jérôme
Cerdon
Challes-la-Montagne
Jujurieux
Labalme
Mérignat
Poncin
Saint-Alban
Saint-Jean-le-Vieux

Demographics

See also
Cantons of the Ain department

Notes

Former cantons of Ain
2015 disestablishments in France
States and territories disestablished in 2015